Modern Day Human Waste is the first official single release from the Finnish metal band Misery Inc., released through Finnish record label Johanna Kustannus (Megamania) on September 19, 2007. It entered at #19 in Finland's official singles chart.

Track listing 

 Modern Day Human Waste
 Beds Are Burning (Midnight Oil-cover)

Track 1 music: Tolonen, Ylämäki, Kauppinen, Lyrics: Tolonen & Mankinen
Track 2 music & lyrics: Garrett, Hirst, Mogine, Gifford
Published by Sony/ATV Music Publishing Scandinavia

2007 singles
2007 songs